Moi is a West Papuan language of the Bird's Head Peninsula of New Guinea.

Phonology

Consonants 

[ʔ] is in free variation with /k/ in word-final position.

Vowels 

/i, u/ can also be heard as [ɪ, ʊ].

References

Languages of western New Guinea

West Bird's Head languages